Latino is a 1985 American war film directed by Haskell Wexler. It was screened in the Un Certain Regard section at the 1985 Cannes Film Festival.

Plot
Set in the context of the Sandinista government in Nicaragua and their battle with the U.S.-backed Contra rebels in 1979, Mexican-American Vietnam vet Eddie Guerrero (Robert Beltran) was sent to help U.S. Special Forces train Contra rebels. Eddie falls for a local girl, Marlena (Annette Charles). However, when her father is killed by the Contras, things change.

Cast
 Robert Beltran as Eddie Guerrero
 Annette Charles as Marlena (as Annette Cardona)
 Américo González as Malena's Father
 Michael Goodwin as Becket
 Ricardo López as Attila
 Gavin MacFadyen as Major Metcalf
 Walter Marín as Gilberto
 Julio Medina as Salazar
 Juan Carlos Ortiz as Marlena's son
 Tony Plana as Ruben
 Luis Torrentes as Luis

References

External links

1985 films
1980s English-language films
American war films
Films directed by Haskell Wexler
Films set in Nicaragua
Films set in 1979
Films set in the 1970s
Lucasfilm films
1980s Spanish-language films
1980s American films